Knight Township is one of eight townships in Vanderburgh County, Indiana, United States. As of the 2010 census, its population was 67,945 and it contained 33,472 housing units. Knight Township has the largest township population in Southwestern Indiana and is the home of nearly 40 percent of Vanderburgh County's population. On October 1, 2009, the City of Evansville officially annexed territory within Knight Township bounded between Burkhardt Road, the Lloyd Expressway and Morgan Avenue.

History
Knight Township was organized in 1840.

Geography

Cities and towns
 Evansville (southeast side)

Unincorporated towns
 Smythe

Adjacent townships
 Indiana
 Vanderburgh County
 Pigeon Township (west)
 Center Township (northwest)
 Warrick County
 Campbell Township (northeast)
 Ohio Township (east)

Cemeteries
The township contains these two cemeteries: Oak Hill and Oates Memorial Park.

Airports and landing strips
 Saint Marys Medical Center Airport

Lakes
 Cross Lake

Landmarks
 Angel Mounds
 University of Evansville
 Swonder Ice Arena
 Wesselman Woods
 Eastland Mall
 Washington Square Mall

School districts
 Evansville-Vanderburgh School Corporation

Political districts
 Indiana's 8th congressional district
 State House District 75
 State House District 77
 State House District 78
 State Senate District 49
 State Senate District 50
 Evansville City Ward 1
 Evansville City Ward 2
 Evansville City Ward 3
 Evansville City Ward 4
 Evansville City Ward 5

References
 
 United States Census Bureau 2007 TIGER/Line Shapefiles
 IndianaMap

External links
 Official Site

Townships in Vanderburgh County, Indiana
Townships in Indiana